Kaiser is a surname derived from the German imperial title Kaiser (English: emperor). The title Kaiser is in turn derived from the Latin title Caesar, which again is a derivation from the personal name of a branch of the gens (clan) Julia, to which belonged Gaius Julius Caesar, the forebear of the first Roman imperial family.

The name is not especially frequent (ca. 0.05% in Germany), but it is still ranked 41st in Germany ). Regions in Germany where it is more frequent are central Germany and the southern half of the Black Forest area, and to a lesser extent Southern Germany. It is also used in Austria and the Czech Republic.

Variation spellings rooted in the Kaiser surname are Kayser, Keiser, Kiser, and Kyser. Dutch cognates of the surname include Keizer, (De) Keijzer, (De) Keyser, and Dekeyser.

Notable people with the surname 
Abraham Kaiser (1852–1912), American businessman and politician
A. Dale Kaiser (born 1927), American molecular biologist
Axel Kaiser (born 1981), Chilean writer and lawyer
Carlos Kaiser (footballer) (born 1963), Brazilian fake footballer
David Kaiser (disambiguation), several people
Elisabeth Kaiser (born 1987), German politician
Franz Kaiser (1891–1962), German astronomer
Frederik Kaiser (1808–1872), Dutch astronomer
Gabriele Kaiser (active since 1997), German mathematics educator
Georg Kaiser (1878–1945), German expressionist playwright
George Kaiser (born 1942), American businessman
Glenn Kaiser (born 1953), American blues musician
Faruk Kaiser (1918–1987), Indian Urdu poet and lyricist
Henry J. Kaiser (1882–1967), American industrialist
Henry Kaiser (musician) (born 1952), American musician
Hilmar Kaiser, German historian
Jack Kaiser (born 1926), American baseball player, coach, and athletic director
Jakob Kaiser (1888-1961), German politician
James Kaiser (born 1929), American electrical engineer
Johannes Kaiser (1936–1996), German Olympic sprinter
Johannes Kaiser (Chilean politician) (born 1976), Chilean YouTuber and deputy
John Anthony Kaiser (1932–2000), American Roman Catholic priest
Joseph Kaiser (born 1977), Canadian opera singer
Louise Kaiser (1891–1973), Dutch phonetician and linguist
Kajetan Georg von Kaiser (1803–1871), German chemist
Kyle Kaiser (born 1996), American racing driver
Ken Kaiser (1945–2017), American Major League Baseball umpire
Max Keiser  (born 1960), American broadcaster and film maker
Mehboob Ali Kaiser (born 1958), Indian politician
Oldřich Kaiser (born 1955), Czech comedy actor
Philip Mayer Kaiser (1913–2007), United States diplomat
Reinhard Keiser (1674–1739), German composer
Robert Blair Kaiser (1931–2015), American writer and journalist
Robert G. Kaiser (born 1943), American journalist of The Washington Post
Roland Kaiser (born 1952), German musician
Roland Kaiser (actor) (1943–1998), German actor
Rolf-Ulrich Kaiser (born 1943), German record producer
Rudolf Kaiser (1922–1991), German sailplane designer
S. M. Kaiser, Indian association football player
Stien Kaiser (born 1938), Dutch speed skater
Tim Kaiser, American television producer
Vanessa Kaiser (born 1978), Chilean politician and academic
Walter Kaiser Jr. (born 1933), American biblical scholar

References 

Occupational surnames
German-language surnames
Jewish surnames
Surnames from nicknames